Maggie O'Farrell, RSL (born 27 May 1972), is a novelist from Northern Ireland. Her acclaimed first novel, After You'd Gone, won the Betty Trask Award, and a later one, The Hand That First Held Mine, the 2010 Costa Novel Award. She has twice been shortlisted since for the Costa Novel Award: for Instructions for a Heatwave in 2014 and This Must Be The Place in 2017. She appeared in the Waterstones 25 Authors for the Future. Her memoir I am, I am, I am: Seventeen Brushes with Death reached the top of the Sunday Times bestseller list. Her novel Hamnet won the Women's Prize for Fiction in 2020, and the fiction prize at the 2020 National Book Critics Circle Awards.

Early life and career
O'Farrell was born in Coleraine in County Londonderry, Northern Ireland, and grew up in Wales and Scotland. At the age of eight she was hospitalised with encephalitis and missed over a year of school. These events are echoed in The Distance Between Us and described in her 2017 memoir I Am, I Am, I Am. She suffered from a pronounced stammer during her childhood and adolescence. She was educated at North Berwick High School and Brynteg Comprehensive School, and then at New Hall, University of Cambridge (now Murray Edwards College), where she read English Literature.

O'Farrell has stated that well into the 1990s, being Irish in Britain could be fraught: "We used to get endless Irish jokes, even from teachers. If I had to spell my name at school, teachers would say things like, 'Oh, are your family in the IRA?’ Teachers would say this to a 12-year-old kid in front of the whole class.... They thought it was hilarious to say, 'Ha ha, your dad's a terrorist'. It wasn't funny at all.... I wish I could say that it's [less common today] because people are less racist, but I think it's just that there are new immigrants who are getting it now." Nevertheless, not until 2013's Instructions for a Heatwave did Irish subjects become part of her work.

O'Farrell worked as a journalist, both in Hong Kong and as deputy literary editor of The Independent on Sunday in London. She also taught creative writing at the University of Warwick in Coventry and Goldsmiths College in London. She has lived in Ireland, Wales, Scotland, Hong Kong, and Italy. She now lives in Edinburgh.

Books
O'Farrell's numerous successful novels, including the Costa-Award-winning The Hand that First Held Mine, have received widespread critical acclaim. Her books have been translated into over 30 languages. Her novel Hamnet, based on the life of Shakespeare's family, was published in 2020. The novel makes a link between the death of eleven-year-old Hamnet and the writing of the play Hamlet.

Her 2017 memoir, I Am, I Am, I Am: Seventeen Brushes with Death, deals with a series of near-death experiences that have occurred to her and her children. It is a memoir told non-chronologically, with each chapter headed by the name of the body part affected.

In 2022, she published The Marriage Portrait, a novel based on the short life of Lucrezia de' Medici, who may or may not have been poisoned by her husband, Alfonso II, Duke of Ferrara. O'Farrell has said that she got the idea for the novel after seeing Lucrezia's portrait, attributed to Agnolo Bronzino, and from reading Robert Browning's poem, My Last Duchess, in which Lucrezia makes a brief, silent and unnamed appearance.

She has also written two pictures books for children, Where Snow Angels Go and The Boy Who Lost His Spark, both illustrated by Daniela Jaglenka Terrazzini.

Personal life
O'Farrell is married to a fellow writer, William Sutcliffe, whom she met while they were students at Cambridge; they didn't become a couple, however, until ten years or so after they graduated. They live in Edinburgh with their three children. She has said of Sutcliffe: "Will's always been my first reader, even before we were a couple, so he's a huge influence. He's brutal but you need that."
One of O'Farrell's children suffers with severe allergies, the challenges of which she writes about in her memoir.

Media
O'Farrell was the invited castaway on the BBC Radio 4 programme Desert Island Discs on Sunday 21 March 2021.

Awards and honours

Bibliography

Novels
After You'd Gone (2000)
My Lover's Lover (2002)
The Distance Between Us (2004)
The Vanishing Act of Esme Lennox (2006)
The Hand That First Held Mine (2010)
Instructions for a Heatwave (2013)
This Must Be the Place (2016)
Hamnet (2020), Tinder Press 
The Marriage Portrait (2022), Tinder Press

Autobiography/Memoir
I Am, I Am, I Am: Seventeen Brushes with Death (2017)

For Children
Where Snow Angels Go, Walker Books, illustrated by Daniela Jaglenka Terrazzini (2020)
The Boy Who Lost His Spark, Walker Books, illustrated by Daniela Jaglenka Terrazzini (2022)

References

External links

Maggie O'Farrell's Top 10 favourite chillers, in The Guardian

Maggie O'Farrell talks about The Distance between Us on MeetThe Author.co.uk
Review of Instructions for a Heatwave
Review of This Must Be the Place
Reseña Tiene que ser aquí en español, por Miryam Artigas
Maggie O'Farrell: Best-selling author explains why she doesn't read reviews or tweet thoughts about her life

21st-century British novelists
People educated at North Berwick High School
1972 births
Living people
People from Coleraine, County Londonderry
Alumni of New Hall, Cambridge
Fellows of the Royal Society of Literature
Women's Prize for Fiction
Costa Book Award winners